Ai Sugiyama and Nathalie Tauziat were the defending champions but they competed with different partners that year, Sugiyama with Daniela Hantuchová and Tauziat with Kimberly Po-Messerli.

Po-Messerli and Tauziat lost in the first round to Dája Bedáňová and Conchita Martínez.

Hantuchová and Sugiyama lost in the semifinals to Cara Black and Elena Likhovtseva.

Lisa Raymond and Rennae Stubbs won in the final 6–2, 6–2 against Black and Likhovtseva.

Seeds
Champion seeds are indicated in bold text while text in italics indicates the round in which those seeds were eliminated.

 Lisa Raymond /  Rennae Stubbs (champions)
 Cara Black /  Elena Likhovtseva (final)
 Kimberly Po-Messerli /  Nathalie Tauziat (first round)
 Nicole Arendt /  Caroline Vis (first round)

Draw

External links
2001 Britannic Asset Management International Championships Doubles draw

Britannic Asset Management International Championships
Doubles